Christoph Langen (born 27 March 1962, in Cologne, North Rhine-Westphalia) is a German bobsledder who competed for the West German and German national team from 1985 to 2005 (as a pilot from 1991). Competing in four Winter Olympics, he won four medals with two golds (Two-man: 2002, Four-man: 1998) and two bronzes (Two-man: 1992, 1998).

Langen was slowed by injuries to his Achilles tendon, which required two surgeries. He attempted to compete for the 2006 Winter Olympics in Turin, but his injuries proved too much. He was a bobsleigh television commentator in Germany until promoted to head coach of the German national team in June 2010.

Langen also won twelve medals at the FIBT World Championships with eight golds (Two-man: 1993, 1995, 1996, 2000, 2001; Four-man: 1991 (as a brakeman), 1996, 2001) and four silvers (Two-man: 1999, 2004; Four-man: 2000, 2004).

He also won the Bobsleigh World Cup combined event twice (199596, 199899), the two-man event three times (199596, 199899, 200304), and the four-man event once (199899).

Additional championships
European champion 2-man crew: 1994, 1995, 1996, 2001, 2004
European champion 4-man crew: 1996, 1999

References

 Bobsleigh two-man Olympic medalists 1932-56 and since 1964
 Bobsleigh four-man Olympic medalists for 1924, 1932-56, and since 1964
 Bobsleigh two-man world championship medalists since 1931
 Bobsleigh four-man world championship medalists since 1930
 
 List of combined men's bobsleigh World Cup champions: 1985-2007
 List of four-man bobsleigh World Cup champions since 1985
 List of two-man bobsleigh World Cup champions since 1985

External links
 
 

1962 births
Living people
Sportspeople from Cologne
German male bobsledders
Bobsledders at the 1988 Winter Olympics
Bobsledders at the 1992 Winter Olympics
Bobsledders at the 1998 Winter Olympics
Bobsledders at the 2002 Winter Olympics
Olympic gold medalists for Germany
Olympic bronze medalists for Germany
Olympic bobsledders of Germany
Olympic bobsledders of West Germany
Olympic medalists in bobsleigh
Medalists at the 2002 Winter Olympics
Medalists at the 1998 Winter Olympics
German racing drivers
Porsche Supercup drivers
ADAC GT Masters drivers
Medalists at the 1992 Winter Olympics
20th-century German people

Porsche Carrera Cup Germany drivers